Hatis, formerly known as Kyankyan, is a village in the Kotayk Province of Armenia. The village is populated by mostly Armenians with Kurds being a minority (about 8%).

See also 
Kotayk Province

References

Populated places in Kotayk Province
Kurdish settlements in Armenia